Haloterrigena longa is a species of archaea in the family Natrialbaceae. It was isolated from Aibi Salt Lake in Xinjiang, China in 2006.

References

External links
Type strain of Haloterrigena longa at BacDive -  the Bacterial Diversity Metadatabase

Halobacteria
Archaea described in 2006